San Jose, California has been home to five Chinatowns that existed until the 1930s:
 First Market Street Chinatown (1866–1870)
 Vine Street Chinatown (1870–1872)
 Second Market Street Chinatown, also known as Plaza Chinatown (1872–1887)
 Woolen Mills Chinatown (1887–1902)
 Heinlenville, also known as the Sixth Street Chinatown (1887–1931)

The two largest Chinatowns were the Second Market Street Chinatown and Heinlenville.

Market Street Chinatown
San Jose's largest Chinatown was founded in the 1860s around the intersection of Market and San Fernando Streets. It burned down in a mysterious fire in 1870, but began to be re-established two years later. Known as the "Market Street Chinatown", it was home to about 1,400 people at its peak. The area at the time was subject to controversy as many whites often complained to the city council about the area as "bothersome". 

In 1887, the area was burned to the ground with many Chinese evicted from the area as the anti-Chinese public sentiment grew. Many artifacts from the Market Street Chinatown were excavated during an urban renewal project to build the Fairmont Hotel and Silicon Valley Financial Center. The City of San Jose formally apologized for the arson in 2021.

The Circle of Palms Plaza lies within the location of the old Market Street Chinatown.

Heinlenville
German immigrant John Heinlen, farmer and businessman, planned a six-block Chinatown with brick structures with water and pipes in the area of Sixth Street and Cleveland Street in 1887, to the dismay of the non-Chinese public and caused public outrage. Heinlen had himself experienced anti-German sentiment, thus sympathized with the Chinese immigrant community. The area was then known as "Heinlenville" and contained a variety of merchants, barbers, traditional doctors, Chinese herbal medicine, and the Ng Shing Gung temple. The area was surrounded by Little Italy and co-existed harmoniously, but then dwindled in the 1920s as the younger generations sought careers outside the area and with a lack of new Chinese coming in due to the Chinese Exclusion Act, the area lost almost all of its Chinese population. At the time, an existing Japantown nearby was emptied due to America's entry into World War II, but was repopulated after the internment of Japanese Americans.

In 1991, the Ng Shing Gung temple was reconstructed in History Park in San Jose and is now a museum containing artifacts from Heinlenville.

See also
 History of the Chinese Americans in San Francisco
 Japantown, San Jose

References

Further reading
 
 

San Jose
Chinese-American culture in California
Chinatowns in California
Neighborhoods in San Jose, California